Edward Stewart (9 October 1808 – 21 March 1875) was a Scottish Whig then Liberal MP in the British Parliament. He was a nephew of the Earl of Galloway.

He represented Wigtown Burghs in 1831–1835.

References

External links 
 

1808 births
1875 deaths
Members of the Parliament of the United Kingdom for Scottish constituencies
Whig (British political party) MPs
Scottish Liberal Party MPs
UK MPs 1831–1832
UK MPs 1832–1835